Max McMurdo (born 24 September 1977) is a British designer, upcycler, entrepreneur and TV presenter. McMurdo established Reestore Ltd in 2003 when he became uneasy at the consumption-focused ways of the traditional design world. In 2007, McMurdo appeared in episode 4 of BBC2's Dragon's Den, he has since worked with George Clarke on George Clarke's Amazing Spaces and with Kirstie Allsopp on Kirstie's Fill Your House For Free, both for Channel 4 television. Max also, occasionally, appears alongside fellow presenter Henry Cole on Find it, Fix it, Flog it, also for Channel 4 television.

References

External links
http://www.maxmcmurdo.co.uk/
http://www.reestore.com/

Living people
Date of birth missing (living people)
Place of birth missing (living people)
British designers
21st-century British businesspeople
1977 births